A gender symbol is a pictogram or glyph used to represent sex and gender, for example in biology and medicine, in genealogy, or in the sociological fields of gender politics, LGBT subculture and identity politics.

Botanists now use  for the last.

These are also used on public toilets in some countries. 

Biology and medicine

The three standard sex symbols in biology are male , female  and hermaphroditic ; originally the symbol for Mercury, was used for the last. These symbols were first used by Carl Linnaeus in 1751 to denote whether flowers were male (stamens only), female (pistil only) or perfect flowers with both pistils and stamens. (Most flowering and conifer plant species are hermaphroditic and either bear flowers/cones that themselves are hermaphroditic, or bear both male and female flowers/cones on the same plant.) These symbols are now ubiquitous in biology and medicine to indicate the sex of an individual, for example of a patient.

Genealogy

Kinship charts use a triangle  for male and circle  for female. Pedigree charts published in scientific papers use an earlier anthropological convention of a square  for male and a circle  for female. 

Before a shape distinction was adopted, all individuals had been represented by a circle in Morgan's 1871 System of Consanguinity and Affinity of Human Family, where gender is encoded in the abbreviations for the kin relation (e.g. M for 'mother' and F for 'father'). W. H. R. River distinguished gender in the words of the language being recorded by writing male kinship terms in all capitals and female kinship terms with normal capitalization. That convention was quite influential for a time, and his convention of prioritizing male kin by placing them to the left and females to the right continues to this day though there have been exceptions, such as Margaret Mead, who placed females to the left.

Public toilets

Before that, local usage had been more variable. For example, schoolhouse outhouses in the 19th-century United States had ventilation holes in their doors that were shaped like a starburst Sun  or like a crescent Moon , respectively, to indicate whether the toilet was for use by boys or girls. The British Rail pictogramsoften color-coded blue and redare now the norm for marking public toilets in much of the world, with the female symbol distinguished by a triangular skirt or dress, and in early years (and sometimes still) the male symbol stylized like a tuxedo.

In elementary schools, the pictograms may be of children rather than of adults, with the girl distinguished by her hair. In themed locations, such as bars and tourist attractions, a thematic image or figurine of a man and woman or boy and girl may be used.

In Poland, an inverted triangle  is used for male while a circle  is used for female. 

In mainland China, silhouettes of heads in profile may be used as gender pictograms, generally alongside the written words (男 for male and 女 for female).

Sexual orientation and gender politics

Since the 1970s, variations of gender symbols have been used to express sexual orientation and gender politics. Two interlocking male symbols  are used to represent gay men while two interlocking female symbols  are often used to represent lesbians.

Since the 2000s, numerous such variants have been introduced in the context of LGBT culture and politics. Some of these symbols have been adopted into Unicode (in the Miscellaneous Symbols block) beginning with version 4.1 in 2005.

Encoding

See also
Alchemical symbol
Astrological symbols
Fertility symbols
LGBT symbols
Miscellaneous Symbols Unicode block

Notes

References

External links

Gender and society
Human gender and sexuality symbols